Toporec is a village and municipality in Kežmarok District in the Prešov Region of north Slovakia.

History
In historical records the village was first mentioned in 1277. Between 1000 and 1918, it was a part of the Kingdom of Hungary. In 1918 it became part of Czechoslovakia. The 1773 and 1796 censuses recorded a Slovak majority.

Toporec was the birthplace of Artúr Görgei.

Geography
The municipality lies at an altitude of 572 metres and covers an area of 28.122 km2 . It has a population of about 1690 people.

References

External links
http://www.statistics.sk/mosmis/eng/run.html

Villages and municipalities in Kežmarok District